Shin Ji-Sang is the pen name of manhwa artist Shin Su-Mi.She debuted in 1991. Shin collaborated with Geo (real name Min Jung-Hwa) to publish Chocolat through Ice Kunion. They also collaborated to create the manhwa called Very! Very! SWEET!

Career
Her early work reflected the unstableness of her 20s. She later gamed some fame due to the influence from the korean wave.

Works
 Chocolat, volumes 1, 2, 3, 4, 5, 6, 7, 8
 Very! Very! Sweet, volumes 1, 2, 3, 4, 5, 6, 7, 8
 Rolling, volume 1

References
 Ice Kunion's official web site

Living people
South Korean manhwa artists
Year of birth missing (living people)